Mühleggbahn is a funicular in the city of St. Gallen, Switzerland. It leads from a lower station south of the old town, near the abbey, at 676 m, to Mühlegg at 747 m in St. Georgen. The 323 m-long line functions as an inclined elevator with a single car, 287 m in a tunnel. Journey time is ca. 90 seconds.

The funicular is owned by "Mühleggbahn AG" and operated by Verkehrsbetriebe St. Gallen.

History 
When opened in 1894, the line worked as a water counterbalancing funicular with two cars and a passing loop. Water was drawn from Mühleggweiher at its upper station.

The system was replaced in 1950 with a rack railway that operated until 1975.

On , it was reopened as a funicular. The car was replaced in 2004 and 2018, tracks in 2018.

Notes

Further reading

References 

<references responsive>

 </ref>
</references>

de:Mühleggbahn
uk:Мюлеггбан
St. Gallen (city)
Muhlegg
Transport in the canton of St. Gallen
1200 mm gauge railways in Switzerland
Railway lines opened in 1894